"Cartoon & Cereal" is a song by American rapper and songwriter Kendrick Lamar, released for digital download on February 14, 2012. Collaborating with Florida-based rapper Gunplay, Lamar originally intended to include the song on his major-label debut album, Good Kid, M.A.A.D City, but was discarded due to sampling issues and the track being leaked online beforehand.

Critical reception
Jack Law, writing for Fact magazine, described experimentation that Lamar demonstrated on his album Section.80, released a year prior: "Kendrick's verse is predictably tricky to penetrate, full of multi-layered imagery and word-play, and will doubtless reward further study". Law further emphasized the unexpected collaboration between Lamar and Gunplay - a collaboration with an avant-garde musician and a "street" rapper. On Pitchfork, Jordan Sargent referred to "Cartoons & Cereal" as the work of two artists who "have an anti-social streak that runs through their music".

"Cartoon & Cereal" is one of Lamar's most popular songs; Complex magazine, which listed it as the second best song of 2012, wrote "the best song ['Cartoon & Cereal'] that Kendrick Lamar released this year didn't even make the album [Good Kid, M.A.A.D City]". Music critic Niyah Nel reflected: "the 'inner voice' like approach on 'Cartoons & Cereal' made just the right impact to lead fans into wondering what to expect from his debut album, and it definitely boosted his ranking as an unmatched lyricist".

References 

2012 songs
Kendrick Lamar songs
Gunplay (rapper) songs
Songs written by Kendrick Lamar
Unreleased songs
Progressive music